Roads & Bridges magazine is a 107-year-old trade publication serving construction and maintenance professionals, as well as heavy equipment manufacturers. The magazine was created by Scranton Gillette Communications in 1906. It provides industry news, information on relevant equipment and safety recommendations   and has been cited in studies of American infrastructure.
Roads & Bridges works with associations such as AASHTO, AEM, ESWP and Artba.  Content is distributed through print, online, live events, custom media and webinars.

Roads & Bridges presents multiple annual awards and produces yearly Top 10 Roads  & Top 10 Bridges Lists.
As of July 2013, Roads & Bridges had 61,000 subscribers for its print edition.

References

External links 
 Roads & Bridges website
 Scranton Gillette Communications, Inc. – Website

Engineering journals